The Three Pashas also known as the Young Turk triumvirate or CUP triumvirate consisted of Mehmed Talaat Pasha (1874–1921), the Grand Vizier (prime minister) and Minister of the Interior; Ismail Enver Pasha (1881–1922), the Minister of War; and Ahmed Cemal Pasha (1872–1922), the Minister of the Navy, who effectively ruled the Ottoman Empire after the 1913 Ottoman coup d'état. According to historian Hans-Lukas Kieser, Talaat's power increased over time and eclipsed the others after 1913–1914.

The Three Pashas, all members of the Committee of Union and Progress, were largely responsible for the Empire's entry into World War I in 1914 and also largely responsible for the genocide of over one million Armenians. The Turkish public widely criticized the Three Pashas for drawing the Ottoman Empire into World War I. All three met violent deaths after the war—Talaat and Cemal were assassinated, whilst Enver died leading the Basmachi Revolt near Dushanbe, present-day Tajikistan.

After their deaths, Talaat and Enver's remains have been reburied at the Monument of Liberty in Istanbul and many of Turkey's streets have been renamed in their honour.

Legacy

Western scholars hold that after the 1913 Ottoman coup d'état, these three men became the de facto rulers of the Ottoman Empire until its dissolution following World War I. They were members of the Committee of Union and Progress, a progressive organization that they eventually came to control and transform into a primarily Pan-Turkist political party.

The Three Pashas were the principal players in the Ottoman–German Alliance and the Ottoman Empire's entry into World War I on the side of the Central Powers. One of the three, Ahmed Djemal, was opposed to an alliance with Germany, and French and Russian diplomacy attempted to keep the Ottoman Empire out of the war; but Germany was agitating for a commitment. It was claimed that Ahmed Cemal agreed in early October 1914 to authorize Admiral Souchon to launch a pre-emptive strike.

Ismail Enver had only once taken the control of any military activity (Battle of Sarıkamış), and left the Third Army in ruins. The First Suez Offensive and Arab Revolt are Ahmed Cemal's most significant failures.

Historiography 
While the triumvirate consisted of Talat, Enver, and Cemal, some say Halil Bey was a fourth member of this clique. Historian Hans-Lukas Kieser asserts that this state of rule by the Three Pashas triumvirate is only accurate for the year 1913–1914, and that Talat Pasha would increasingly become a more central figure within the Union and Progress party state, especially once he also became Grand Vizier in 1917. Alternatively, it would also be accurate to call the Unionist regime a clique or even an oligarchy, as many prominent Unionists held some form of de jure or de facto power. Other than the Three Pashas and Halil Bey, personalities such as Dr. Nazım, Bahaeddin Şakir, Mehmed Reşid, Ziya Gökalp, and the party's secretary general Midhat Şükrü also dominated the Central Committee without formal positions in the Ottoman government. The CUP regime was also less hierarchically totalitarian than future European dictatorships. Instead of relying on strict and rigid chains of command the regime functioned through the balancing of factions through massive corruption and kickbacks. Individual governors were allowed much autonomy, such as Cemal Pasha's governorship of Syria and Rahmi Bey's governorship of the Izmir vilayet. This lack of rule of law, lack of respect to the constitution, and extreme corruption would worsen as the regime aged.

Involvement in Armenian genocide
As de facto rulers, the Three Pashas have been considered the masterminds behind the Armenian genocide. After the war the three were put on trial (in their absence) and sentenced to death, although the sentences were not carried out. Talaat and Cemal were assassinated in exile in 1921 and 1922 by Armenians; Enver died in a Red Army ambush in Tajikistan in 1922 while trying to raise a Muslim anti-Russian insurrection.

Reputation in the Republic of Turkey
After World War I and the ensuing Turkish War of Independence, much of the population of the newly established Republic of Turkey as well its founder Mustafa Kemal Atatürk widely criticized the Three Pashas for having caused the Ottoman Empire's entrance into World War I, and the subsequent collapse of the state. As early as 1912, Atatürk (then just Mustafa Kemal) had severed his ties to the Three Pashas' Committee of Union and Progress, dissatisfied with the direction that they had taken the party, as well as developing a rivalry with Enver Pasha. Although Enver Pasha later attempted to join the Turkish War of Independence, the Angora (Ankara) government under Atatürk blocked his return to Turkey and his efforts to join the war effort.

See also
 Young Turk Revolution
 Second Constitutional Era
 1913 Ottoman coup d'état
 Armenian genocide

References

Sources
 Allen, W.E.D. and R. Muratoff. Caucasian Battlefields: A History Of The Wars On The Turco-Caucasian Border, 1828–1921. Cambridge: Cambridge University Press, 1953. 614 pp.
 Bedrossyan, Mark D. The First Genocide of the 20th Century: The Perpetrators and the Victims. Flushing, NY: Voskedar Publishing, 1983. 479 pp.
 Derogy, Jacques. Resistance and Revenge: "Fun Times" The Armenian Assassination of the Turkish Leaders Responsible for the 1915 Massacres and Deportations. New Brunswick, NJ: Transaction Publishers and Zoryan Institute, April 1990. 332 pp.
 Düzel, Neşe (2005-05-23). "Ermeni mallarını kimler aldı?". Radikal. "Enver Paşa, Talat Paşa, Bahaittin Şakir gibi bir dizi insanın ailelerine maaş bağlanıyor... Bu maaşlar, Ermenilerden kalan mülkler, paralar ve fonlardan bağlanıyor."
 Emin [Yalman], Ahmed. Turkey in the World War. New Haven, CT: Yale University Press, 1930. 310 pp.
 Joseph, John. Muslim-Christian Relations and Inter-Christian Rivalries in the Middle East. Albany: State Univ. of New York Press, 1983. 240 pp.
 Kayalı, Hasan. "Arabs and Young Turks: Ottomanism, Arabism, and Islamism in the Ottoman Empire, 1908–1918" 195 pp.

Committee of Union and Progress
People convicted by the Ottoman Special Military Tribunal
Politics of the Ottoman Empire
Ottoman Empire in World War I
1913 establishments in the Ottoman Empire
1918 disestablishments in the Ottoman Empire